Zygonoides is a genus of dragonflies in the family Libellulidae. There are large, spectacular species. Three species occur in continental Africa and one, F. lachesis, in Madagascar.

The genus contains the following species:
Zygonoides fraseri 
Zygonoides fuelleborni  - Fuelleborn's Bottle-tail, Robust Bottletail, Robust Riverking
Zygonoides lachesis 
Zygonoides occidentis

References

Libellulidae
Anisoptera genera
Taxa named by Frederic Charles Fraser
Taxonomy articles created by Polbot